Richard Krajicek was the defending champion, but lost in the quarterfinals this year.

Karol Kučera won the tournament, beating Anders Järryd in the final, 7–6(9–7), 7–6(7–4).

Seeds

Draw

Finals

Top half

Bottom half

References

 Main Draw

Rosmalen Grass Court Championships
1995 ATP Tour